Who Profits? (Mi Marviha?) is an independent research center which investigates links between the private sector and the economy in the Israeli-occupied territories. The Center was founded in 2007 as a project by the Israeli Coalition of Women for Peace and became independent in 2013. The director of Who Profits?, Dalit Baum, explains the idea as follows:

On its website Who Profits? keeps an updated database of Israeli and international corporations involved in the occupation. The database is often consulted by the BDS movement when selecting boycott targets.

Who Profits? has published reports about Israeli cosmetics manufacturer Ahava, the international security giant G4S, and the rental online marketplace Airbnb.

See also 
 Boycott from Within

References

Citations

Sources

External links 
 Who Profits?
 Dalit Baum - Who Profits from the Israeli Occupation? April 12, 2012

Boycott, Divestment and Sanctions
Boycotts of Israel
Human rights in the State of Palestine